The Chief of the General Staff is the highest-ranking and most senior military officer of the Armed Forces of the Czech Republic. He is appointed by the President of the Czech Republic, who is the commander-in-chief. The current Chief of the General Staff is Major General Karel Řehka.

List of officeholders
For period from 1919 to 1992, see Chief of the General Staff of Czechoslovakia.

See also
 Army of the Czech Republic

Notes

References

Military of the Czech Republic
Czech